The Building Societies (Funding) and Mutual Societies (Transfers) Act 2007 (sometimes referred to as the Butterfill Act) is an Act of the Parliament of the United Kingdom.  The Act gives building societies greater powers to merge with other companies.

Passage through Parliament

The Bill was introduced as a Private Members' Bill by Conservative Member of Parliament Sir John Butterfill, originally titled the Financial Mutuals Arrangements Bill.  It was also known as the Butterfill Bill.

Mergers under the Act

There have been several high-profile mergers under the auspices of the Act.

In August 2009, Britannia Building Society merged with Co-operative Financial Services (part of The Co-operative Group).  Britannia initially continued as a brand, although owned by the Co-op.

In February 2011, Kent Reliance Building Society pooled its assets with American private equity bank J.C. Flowers & Co..  J.C. Flowers & Co. has a 40% interest in the new bank, named OneSavings Bank plc, with the other 60% in the hands of Kent Reliance Provident Society, a mutual organisation owned by former Kent Reliance BS members.  The bank trades as Kent Reliance.

See also
Building Societies Act

References

External links
The Building Societies (Funding) and Mutual Societies (Transfers) Act 2007, as amended from the National Archives.
The Building Societies (Funding) and Mutual Societies (Transfers) Act 2007, as originally enacted from the National Archives.
Explanatory notes to the Building Societies (Funding) and Mutual Societies (Transfers) Act 2007.

United Kingdom Acts of Parliament 2007
2007 in economics
Building societies of the United Kingdom